RNA-binding protein with serine-rich domain 1 is a protein that in humans is encoded by the RNPS1 gene.

Function 

This gene encodes a protein that is part of a post-splicing multiprotein complex, the exon junction complex, involved in both mRNA nuclear export and mRNA surveillance. mRNA surveillance detects exported mRNAs with truncated open reading frames and initiates nonsense-mediated mRNA decay (NMD). When translation ends upstream from the last exon-exon junction, this triggers NMD to degrade mRNAs containing premature stop codons. This protein binds to the mRNA and remains bound after nuclear export, acting as a nucleocytoplasmic shuttling protein. This protein contains many serine residues. Two splice variants have been found for this gene; both variants encode the same protein.

Interactions 

RNPS1 has been shown to interact with SART3 and Pinin.

References

Further reading

External links